Andre Agassi defeated Ivan Lendl in the final, 3–6, 6–2, 6–0 to win the men's singles tennis title at the 1992 Canadian Open.

Andrei Chesnokov was the reigning champion, but did not participate this year.

Seeds

Draw

Finals

Top half

Section 1

Section 2

Section 3

Section 4

External links
 1992 Canadian Open draw

1992 ATP Tour